Public Senior High School 82 Jakarta is a public senior high school in Jakarta, Indonesia. It is located at Jl. Daha II / 15A, Kebayoran Baru, South Jakarta. Phone no. 021-7246413. Website: http://sman82jkt.sch.id

Schools in Jakarta
Senior high schools in Indonesia